Agou may refer to:

People
Christophe Agou (born 1969), French photographer

Places
Agou, Ivory Coast
Agou, Togo
Mount Agou, a mountain in Togo